Metro Rapid is a local express bus service with bus rapid transit (BRT) characteristics in Los Angeles County, California.

At its peak, Metro had dozens of Rapid routes, but , the system has been largely discontinued. Just three Metro operated Rapid routes remain, along with four routes operated by Big Blue Bus, one by Culver CityBus and one by Torrance Transit.

To reduce travel times, buses are equipped with a special transmitter that send a signal to traffic lights, which cause them to favor the bus by holding green lights longer and shortening red lights. Metro Rapid buses also stop less frequently than other routes, with Rapid stops located only at major intersections and transfer points. The frequency of Metro Rapid buses is increased as well, as more buses on a line translates to less wait time at each station. All Metro Rapid buses are low-floor CNG buses for faster boarding and alighting and distinguished by their prominent red color.

Overview 

The Metro Rapid Program was implemented in June 2000-December 2002 with the goal of improving bus speeds within urbanized Los Angeles County. Lines 720 (Wilshire), 745 (Broadway), 754 (Vermont), and 750 (Ventura) were the pilot routes of the program. Metro claims travel times were reduced by as much as 29%.

Metro Rapid buses are distinguished by their red and silver livery. Some Rapid stops are equipped with "NextBus" technology which indicates the wait time before the next bus arrives. NextBus displays were installed mostly at stops on Lines 720 and 750.

Metro Rapid Lines 720, 744, 770, and 780 were the only lines that complemented multiple lines (the 720 ran alongside the 18 and 20; the 744 ran alongside 233 and 240; the 770 ran alongside 68 and 70; and the 780 rans alongside the 180, 181 and 217); Line 720 is the longest route in the Metro Rapid system. It takes roughly 2 hours from start to end during rush hours. Also, line 720 is the most frequent of all Rapids. In the morning rush hour, the Rapid 720 ranges from every 2–10 minutes. As of June 27, 2021, most lines that complemented multiple lines, except Lines 720 and 754, were discontinued as a result of Metro’s NextGen Bus Plan by merging the Rapid Lines with their Local counterparts to create higher frequency. Line 720 was truncated to Downtown LA at 6th/Central meaning it will no longer complement Line 18 east to Commerce Center. 
A year after Metro introduced SmartBus technology on most of their buses, marquees were modified on most Metro Rapid buses in which the "STOP REQUESTED" portion scrolls across the marquee instead of staying in place and "PLEASE USE REAR EXIT" scrolls slowly. Months later, marquees were switched back to their original format.

The fare is the same as other Metro bus and rail service. Routes are numbered in the 700 series (7xx).

In February 2020, Metro announced their NextGen Bus Plan that proposed an elimination of the majority of the Metro Rapid lines, merging them into their Metro Local counterparts. Most Metro Rapid routes, except for Lines 720 and 754 were discontinued, while Line 761 was replaced with a new termini at the Sylmar Metrolink Station.

Criticism
Critics see the Metro Rapid system as not sufficient to meet Los Angeles' growing transit needs.  Limited funds, they say, would be better spent on extending the region's rail network.
The opposite is backed by sound research „In higher income countries ...  an HRT alternative is likely to cost up to 40 times as much as a BRT alternative, and up to 12 times as much as an LRT alternative."  Some critics argued Rapid buses might not have the capacity or efficiency of light- or heavy-rail technology.

Other critics claim that Metro Rapid is a triumph of marketing over substance. Substance might mean tables of passengers in peak hour per direction (PPHPD) observed: 14 LRT Systems, 14 HRT systems (1 track, excluding 3  2-track-systems),  56 BRT systems and the conclusion, that BRT „capacity on TransMilenio exceeds all but the highest capacity HRT systems, and it far exceeds the highest LRT system.“ - i.e. best LRT had 13,400 PPHPD, best 1 track HRT 36,000 PPHPD, best BRT 37,700 PPHPD.  More topical is „Maximum passender load (per hour per direction) 45,000 – Daily passenger load (total) 1,000,000“ in a 1-lane-system using articulated buses. 

For many years, Metro and its predecessor, the SCRTD, operated limited-stop routes, which were similar to Metro Rapid service in the middle of their routes (serving only transfer points and major stops), but made local stops at each end.  Rapid buses do not change traffic signals outside of the City of Los Angeles because only the city has tied the transponders to the signal network. The Los Angeles County Department of Public Works is working on rectifying the problem for all the other cities where Rapid buses pass through, but individual signals have to be reprogrammed to give signal priority to Rapid buses.  In addition, only Rapid-branded buses have transponders, which causes problems when not enough Rapid buses are available (or conversely, when Rapid-branded buses are used on Local service).

Another complaint concerns the placement of Local and Rapid stops at separate locations at the same intersection. This was done to eliminate the backing up of buses at stops, but has resulted in a dangerous move called the "Rapid Bus Shuffle", in which a rider waiting at a Local stop runs to a Rapid stop, or vice versa, if the other bus arrives first. In response, some Rapid stops are placed adjacent to Local bus stops.

In addition, civil rights organizations like the Bus Riders Union complain about cutbacks in Local service required to implement Rapid service. Generally, between 25 and 50% of Local service is cut and replaced by Rapid service.  Thus, riders not living or working near a Rapid stop must walk a longer distance to an intersection with both Local and Rapid stops, or wait longer for a Local bus.  The Special Master of the consent decree between Metro and the BRU has ordered that no more than 33% of the resources for Rapids come from Local service.

Metro staff has never considered Metro Rapid a substitute for rail service, but is instead a pragmatic interim measure given current budgetary constraints.

Another major complaint is the lack of Saturday, Sunday, and holiday service on several of its high-volume routes like the 705, 710 and 740 where many patrons commute from inner-city suburbs, Downtown LA, or the South Bay to major cities for their jobs and local shopping.

Routes

Current Metro Rapid Routes

Rapid routes operated by other agencies

Former routes

References

External links
Metro Rapid Homepage

Los Angeles County Metropolitan Transportation Authority
 Metro Rapid
Metro Rapid
 Metro Rapid
Bus rapid transit in California
2000 establishments in California